is a Japanese anime director, animator, storyboard artist, and manga artist. She is best known for her work with Kyoto Animation, particularly as the original director of Free!. After leaving Kyoto Animation's affiliate company Animation Do, she directed the anime adaptation of Banana Fish manga, and created and directed SK8 the Infinity with Bones. She is a graduate of the Osaka Municipal College of Design.

Works

Television animation
Full Metal Panic! The Second Raid (2005), animator
The Melancholy of Haruhi Suzumiya (2006), animator 
Kanon (2006–2007), animator 
Lucky Star (2007), animator 
Clannad (2007–2008), animator 
Clannad After Story (2008–2009), animator 
The Melancholy of Haruhi Suzumiya (2009), assistant director and animator 
K-On! (2009), animator 
K-On!! (2010), storyboard artist, episode director, animator
Nichijou (My Ordinary Life) (2011), storyboard artist, episode director, animator
Hyouka (2012), storyboard artist, episode director and animator
Love, Chunibyo & Other Delusions (2012), storyboard artist and episode director
Tamako Market (2013), storyboard artist and animator
Beyond the Boundary (2013–2014), storyboard artist and episode director
Free! (2013), series director, storyboard artist, episode director, unit director
Love, Chunibyo & Other Delusions -Heart Throb- (2014), storyboard  artist
Free! Eternal Summer (2014), series director, storyboard artist, episode director
Days (2016), storyboard artist and unit director for closing animation
Bungo Stray Dogs (2016), storyboard artist
My Hero Academia (2017), storyboard artist and unit director for second season closing animation
Altair: A Record of Battles (2017), storyboard artist
Banana Fish (2018), series director, storyboard artist, episode director
Dororo (2019), storyboard artist
SK8 the Infinity (2021–present), series director, original creator, storyboard artist, episode director
Hell's Paradise: Jigokuraku Teaser PV (2021), key animator

Original video animation
Lucky Star OVA (2008), animator
K-On! (2010), unit director and animator

Film animation
Munto (2009), animator
The Disappearance of Haruhi Suzumiya (2010), animator and unit director
K-On! (2011), animator and unit director
Tamako Love Story (2014), production committee 
Yu-Gi-Oh!: The Dark Side of Dimensions (2016), animation director and animator

Manga
Super Carve! (2016–present), serialized in Animedia

Short animation
Star (2011), animator 
Swimsuit (2013), storyboard artist

External links

References

Living people
Manga artists
Women manga artists
Japanese female comics artists
Female comics writers
Japanese animators
Japanese women film directors
Japanese animated film directors
Anime directors
Japanese storyboard artists
Year of birth missing (living people)
Kyoto Animation people